Rauan Erlanovich Sariyev (born 22 January 1994) is a Kazakhstani footballer who is last known to have played as a midfielder or attacker for Zhetysu II. Besides Kazakhstan, he has played in Brazil.

Career

In 2009, Sariyev joined the youth academy of Brazilian fourth tier side Olé Brasil. In 2011, he joined the youth academy of Atlético-MG in the Brazilian top flight, Before the 2013 season, Sariev signed for Kazakhstani top flight club Kairat, where he made 7 league appearances and scored 0 goals. On 30 March 2013, he debuted for Kairat during a 0–0 draw with Atyrau. After that, he signed for Zhetysu II in the Kazakhstani second tier.

References

External links
 

Kazakhstani footballers
1994 births
Kazakhstan Premier League players
FC Kairat players
FC Zhetysu players
FC Ordabasy players
Association football forwards
Living people
Expatriate footballers in Brazil
Kazakhstani expatriate footballers
Association football midfielders